William Henry Spears (29 July 1877 – 20 August 1957) was an Australian rules footballer who played with Carlton and Collingwood in the Victorian Football League (VFL).

Notes

External links 

Billy Spears's profile at Blueseum

1877 births
1957 deaths
Australian rules footballers from Melbourne
Carlton Football Club players
Collingwood Football Club players
People from Cheltenham, Victoria